Senator Frelinghuysen may refer to:

Frederick Theodore Frelinghuysen (1817–1885), U.S. Senator from New Jersey from 1871 to 1877
Frederick Frelinghuysen (general) (1753–1804), U.S. Senator from New Jersey from 1793 to 1796
Joseph S. Frelinghuysen Sr. (1869–1948), U.S. Senator from New Jersey from 1917 to 1923
Theodore Frelinghuysen (1787–1862), U.S. Senator from New Jersey from 1829 to 1835

See also
Frelinghuysen (disambiguation)